Aberdare East is a local government community and electoral ward in Rhondda Cynon Taf, Wales. The community was formed in 2016 when the former community of Aberdare was split into two. Aberdare East includes the main town of Aberdare.

Community
The Aberdare East community came into effect on 1 December 2016 following the enactment of The Rhondda Cynon Taf (Communities) Order 2016. The area includes the town centre of Aberdare as well as Robertstown and the nearby village of Abernant

According to the 2011 UK Census Aberdare East had a population of 6,561.

Electoral ward
An electoral ward of Aberdare East exists electing two county councillors to Rhondda Cynon Taf County Borough Council since 1995.

Since 1995 the ward has consistently elected Welsh Labour councillors. Cllr Mike Forey has represented the ward on the new county council since 1995, while fellow councillor Steve Bradwick has represented the ward since 2008.

Cllr Bradwick took over at the 2008 election from Dr Shah Imtiaz, who had represented the ward for the Labour Party on Cynon Valley Borough Council and Rhondda Cynon Taf Council since 1973.

See also
 Aberdare West

References

Communities in Rhondda Cynon Taf
Wards of Rhondda Cynon Taf
Aberdare